Witrogoszcz  (German: Guntergost) is a village in the administrative district of Gmina Łobżenica, within Piła County, Greater Poland Voivodeship, in west-central Poland.

The village has a population of 530.

References

Witrogoszcz